Tomiño is a municipality in the province of Pontevedra in the autonomous community of Galicia, in Spain. It is situated in the comarca of O Baixo Miño. It is located on the Miño River.

Politics

References

Municipalities in the Province of Pontevedra